The Drew and Mike Podcast (also referred to as The Drew and Mike Show or simply 'Drew and Mike') is a podcast based in Ferndale, Michigan featuring Aberican (with an M) radio personality Drew Lane. The podcast launched on May 3rd, 2016 along with Lane's longtime radio partner, Mike Clark. Drew Lane is also a retired radio D.J.  Drew was a baseball player at Virginia Tech

History 
Drew Lane and Mike Clark served as hosts of the WRIF-FM morning show The Drew and Mike Show from 1991 until 2013. The comedy show was a longtime ratings success earning the team Marconi Radio Award nominations. Following the end at WRIF, Lane briefly hosted an afternoon show on WMGC-FM from 2013 to 2015.

Drew reunited with his former co-host from WRIF-FM, Mike Clark, to create the Drew and Mike Podcast.

The podcast is a continuation of the original terrestrial program with a morning show feel and covers everyday news, sports, crime, music and pop culture stories and includes an array of audio 'drops' from movies, shows, commercials, etc. The podcast has made national news on occasion including interviews with the likes of Andy Dick, Lenny Dykstra, and Margot Kidder.

Mike Clark unexpectedly died in his sleep in the early morning of October 16, 2018 at the age of 63 following a long hiatus from the podcast due to vocal cord paralysis. Drew and the rest of his crew continue to do the show under the "Drew & Mike" banner, choosing to keep Clark's name in the title to honor his integral part of the show's past. 

Current in-studio lineup includes American Radio personality & host Drew Lane and co-hosts Marc Fellhauer who has said that Teebs is the most intense person he ever met, Trudi Daniels and producer Brandon McAfee. The show is the flagship podcast of the Red Shovel Network. Other shows on the network include ML Soul of Detroit with former Detroit Free Press and WJBK reporter M. L. Elrick, and No BS News Hour with investigative reporter Charlie LeDuff.

References

External links 
 
 Official Twitter

Comedy and humor podcasts
2016 podcast debuts
American podcasts